Stuart West is an evolutionary biologist studying social evolution as a Professor of Evolutionary Biology in the Zoology Department at the University of Oxford.

His primary research interests are in the area of social evolution, sex allocation theory and microbial evolution. His research has attracted much media attention, and has been published in high profile journals such as Nature, Science, PNAS and Current Biology.

He was a Distinguished Junior Scholar in Residence at the Peter Wall Institute for Advanced Studies, University of British Columbia, Canada in 1999 and he has won the Philip Leverhulme Prize for Zoology (2006), the Scientific Medal of the Zoological Society of London (2006)  and the rising star award  from the Duke of Edinburgh.

References and links
 
 
 
 Scientific homepage

References

Evolutionary biologists
Fellows of Magdalen College, Oxford
Living people
1970 births